Grant George is an American voice actor who is known for voicing characters in anime dubs and video games. George is best known as the voice of Izuru Kira from the internationally acclaimed Bleach anime series, the Warrior of Light from Final Fantasy, Shinjiro Aragaki from the Persona series, Night Rikuo from the Nura: Rise of the Yokai Clan series, Uzu Sanageyama from Kill la Kill, Chikage Rokujo from the Durarara!! series, Shuichi Saihara from Danganronpa V3: Killing Harmony,  Keiichi Maebara from When They Cry, Lancer from Fate/Zero, and Gilgamesh from the Studio Deen adaption of Fate/stay night series and movie. He has also voiced Scott Lang in several of the Marvel animated series.

Personal life 
Grant is married to fellow voice actress Jessica Gee-George, with whom he has two children.

Dubbing roles

Anime

 A Lull in the Sea – Itaru Shiodome
 Ah My Buddha – Sakon
 Baki – Sikorsky
 Bleach – Izuru Kira, additional voices
 Bludgeoning Angel Dokuro-Chan – Umezawa
 Boruto: Naruto Next Generations – Suigetsu Hozuki
 Charlotte – Udo, Gondo
 Code Geass: Lelouch of the Rebellion – Kento Sugiyama
 Cyborg 009 (2001 Series) – Ryan (Ep. 9)
 Digimon Fusion – Dorbickmon
 Disgaea – Vyers, King Krichevskoy
 Durarara!!×2 – Rokujo Chikage
 Eiken – Shima Kurosawa
 Eyeshield 21 – Tetsuo Ishimaru, Unsui Kongo
 Fate/stay night – Gilgamesh
 Fate/Zero – Lancer
 Fighting Spirit – Tatsuya Kimura
 Ghost in the Shell: S.A.C. 2nd GIG – Akamine
 Glitter Force Doki Doki - Jonathan "Johnny" Klondike
 Higurashi When They Cry – Keiichi Maebara
 Hunter x Hunter - Knov
 Initial D – Seiji Iwaki (Tokyopop Dub)
 If I See You in My Dreams – Funakoshi
 JoJo's Bizarre Adventure: Stardust Crusaders - Dan of Steel/Steely Dan
 K – Ichigen Miwa (Previous Colorless King), Andy Domyoji, Akira Hidaka, Rikio Kamamoto, Sota Mishina, Daiki Fuse
 Kanokon – Saku Ezomori
 Kekkaishi – Gen Shishio
 Kill la Kill – Uzu Sanageyama
 Kite Liberator – Rin Gaga
 Kyo Kara Maoh! – Christel, Ken Murata
 Di Gi Charat: Leave it to Piyoko! – Rik Heisenberg
 Mahoromatic – Additional voices
 Marvel Anime: Blade – Ladu (Ep. 1)
 Marvel Future Avengers – Karnak
 Mazinkaizer SKL – Kiba
 Mobile Suit Gundam: Iron-Blooded Orphans – Iok Kujan
 Mob Psycho 100 – Ryo Shimazaki
 Monster – Detective Batela
 Moribito: Guardian of the Spirit – Yarsam (Ep. 12)
 Mouse – Sorata Muon/Mouse
 Naruto – Yoroi Akado
 Naruto Shippuden – Suigetsu Hozuki, Torune, Yoroi Akado, Urakaku, Fire Daimyō
 Nodame Cantabile – Ryutaro Mine
 Nura: Rise of the Yokai Clan series – Rikuo Nura (Yokai Form)
 Pokémon Origins - Cubone
 Requiem from the Darkness – Momosuke Yamaoka
 Sailor Moon – Joe, Kitakata, Gamecen (Ep. 25, 137 Viz Media dub)
 Skip Beat! - Sho Fuwa
 Sugar, A Little Snow Fairy – Henry (Ep. 1), additional voices
 Sword Art Online II – Zexceed/Tamotsu Shigemura
 Tokko – Ichiro Hanazo
 Ultra Maniac – Mr. Mikami, Shiro
 Yukikaze – Hangar Announcement (Ep. 5), Radar Operator
 Zetman – Kouga Amagi
 Huntik: Secrets & Seekers – Den Fears
 Miraculous: Tales of Ladybug and Cat Noir – Additional voices

Filmography

Animation
 Avengers Assemble – Ant-Man (season 1–3), additional voices
 Barbie: Life in the Dreamhouse – Randy Bravo
 Big Rig Buddies – Rocky the Robot Truck, Stinky the Garbage Truck (formerly)
 Elena of Avalor – Troyo
 Ever After High – Hunter Huntsman
 Guardians of the Galaxy – Ant-Man
 Lego Marvel Super Heroes: Avengers Reassembled – Ant-Man
 Miraculous: Tales of Ladybug & Cat Noir - Lê Chiến Kim/King Monkey, Markov, Bob Roth, Longg
 Ultimate Spider-Man: Web Warriors – Ant-Man, additional voices
 Popples - Yikes

Film
 Little Big Panda - Additional voices
 Avengers Confidential: Black Widow and Punisher – Elihas Starr
 Bleach: The DiamondDust Rebellion – Izuru Kira
 Bleach: Memories of Nobody – Izuru Kira
 Fate/stay night: Unlimited Blade Works – Gilgamesh
 Fly Me to the Moon – Russian Fly (uncredited)
 Ghost in the Shell 2.0 – Additional voices
 Hotel Transylvania 2 – Additional voices
 Naruto Shippuden the Movie: Blood Prison – Satori
 Tales from Earthsea – Additional voices
 Team Hot Wheels: The Origin of Awesome! – Gage, Male Reporter, Pilot
 The Happy Cricket – Father Cricket
 The House of Magic – Daniel

Video games

 007: From Russia with Love – Additional voices
 The 3rd Birthday – Additional Voices
 Ace Combat Zero: The Belkan War - Gelb 2, Remnant soldier
 Arcania: Gothic 4 – Baldrum, Galamod, Trainer, various
 Armored Core V - City Police Officer A, AC Pilot
 Atlantica Online – Additional voices
 Atelier Rorona: The Alchemist of Arland – Tristan/Tantris
 Bladestorm: The Hundred Year War – William
 BlazBlue: Chronophantasma – Kagura Mutsuki (uncredited)
 Bleach: Shattered Blade – Izuru Kira
 Culdcept Saga – Main Game Saga (uncredited)
 Danganronpa: Trigger Happy Havoc – Leon Kuwata (uncredited)
 Danganronpa V3: Killing Harmony – Shuichi Saihara (uncredited) 
 Dead or Alive 5 – Brad Wong (uncredited)
 Dead or Alive: Dimensions – Brad Wong, Victor Donovan
 Detective Pikachu – Simon Yen, Walter Eckhart
 Dirge of Cerberus: Final Fantasy VII – Additional voices
 Dissidia Final Fantasy – Warrior of Light
 Dissidia 012 Final Fantasy – Warrior of Light
 Dissidia Final Fantasy NT – Warrior of Light
 Disgaea series – Vyers/King Krichevskoy, Axel, Prinny (uncredited)
 Dynasty Warriors 5: Xtreme Legends – Sun Jian, additional voices (uncredited)
 Dynasty Warriors 5: Empires – Sun Jian, additional voices (uncredited)
 Dynasty Warriors 6 – Sun Jian, additional voices (uncredited)
 Dynasty Warriors StrikeForce – Light Equipment Officer (uncredited)
 EverQuest II: The Fallen Quest – Additional voices
 Evolve – EMET
 Final Fantasy Type-0 HD – Additional voices
 Final Fantasy XIII-2 – Additional voices
 Final Fantasy XIV: A Realm Reborn – Cid nan Garlond
 Fire Emblem Echoes: Shadows of Valentia – Clive
 Fire Emblem Engage – Sigurd
 Fire Emblem Heroes – Clive, Sigurd
 Gothic 3 – Additional voices
 Heroes of the Storm – Gall
 Hitman: Blood Money – Additional voices
 Hour of Victory – Calvin Blackwell, Commander
 Kamen Rider: Dragon Knight – Axe
 Killzone 3 – Additional voices
 Lord of Magna: Maiden Heaven – Kaiser 
 Luminous Arc – Alph (uncredited)
 MechWarrior: Tactical Command – David Lee, Nathaniel Hammer
 Monster Kingdom: Jewel Summoner – Bargus
 Naruto Shippuden series – Suigetsu Hozuki
 Nier Replicant ver.1.22474487139... - Additional voices
 Octopath Traveler - Additional voices
 Odin Sphere – Krois, additional voices (uncredited)
 Operation Darkness – Additional voices (uncredited)
 Persona 3 – Shinjiro Aragaki, Jin Shirato, Officer Kurosawa (uncredited)
 Persona 3 FES – Shinjiro Aragaki, Jin Shirato
 Persona 3 Portable - Shinjiro Aragaki, Jin Shirato, Officer Kurosawa
 Pimp My Ride – Vinny, Shady Guy, Additional Voices
 Prinny 2 – Prinny
 Radiata Stories – Cesar, Shin, Johan (uncredited)
 Rondo of Swords – Lloyd
 Sengoku Basara: Samurai Heroes – Additional voices (warriors)
 Shenmue III – Additional Cast
 Shinobido 2: Revenge of Zen – Ichijo Samurai General, Kihan Oxcar
 Sin & Punishment: Star Successor – Isa
 Sky Crawlers: Innocent Aces – Kaida
 Soulcalibur III – Kilik (uncredited)
 Soulcalibur IV – Kilik (uncredited)
 Soulcalibur: Broken Destiny – Kilik (uncredited)
 Soulcalibur V – Kilik
 Spectrobes: Origins – Tidy, Scout
 Star Ocean: First Departure – Cyuss Warren
 Star Ocean: The Last Hope – Grafton (uncredited)
Stranger of Paradise: Final Fantasy Origin – Warrior of Light
 Stranglehold – Jerry Ying
 Tales of Legendia – Curtis (uncredited)
 Tales of Vesperia: Definitive Edition - Yuri Lowell
 Tarr Chronicles – Additional voices
 Tom Clancy's H.A.W.X 2 – Additional voices
 Tom Clancy's Splinter Cell: Double Agent – Additional voices
 Trinity Universe – Prinny
 Ultimate Band – Alex, Alec
 Victorious Boxers 2: Fighting Spirit – Tatsuya Kimura, Miguel Zale
 Warriors Orochi – Sun Jian (uncredited)
 Wild Arms 4 – Lambda, Earthbound, Necromancer, Gob, Melchrom
 Work Time Fun – Muscle Man
 World of Final Fantasy – Warrior of Light
 World of Warcraft: Burning Crusade – Male Blood Elf
 World of Warcraft: Cataclysm – Cho'gall (right head), Cyclonas, Shannox
 World of Warcraft: Warlords of Draenor – Additional voices
 World of Warcraft: Legion – Koltira Deathweaver
 WWE SmackDown! Shut Your Mouth – Various crowd members
 Ys Seven – Additional voices
 Yoga Wii – Yoga Instructor

Live action
 Dawn of the Dead – ADR group
 Cable Girls – Carlos Cifuentes (English dub)
 Cromartie High – The Movie – Hayashida (English dub)
 Flu – Byung-ki (English dub)
 Violetta – Luca (English dub)

References

External links
 Official Website
 
 
 

Living people
American male voice actors
American male video game actors
20th-century American male actors
21st-century American male actors
Audiobook narrators
Year of birth missing (living people)
Place of birth missing (living people)